Twenty-four known prisoner-of-war camps existed across Canada during World War I. The ethnic groups arrested and detained in internment camps were Austro-Hungarians (mostly Ukrainians) and Germans.  Austro-Hungarian Prisoners were mainly residents of Canada from Ukraine, part of Serbia, the Czech Republic, Slovakia. Since Ukraine, part of Serbia, the Czech Republic and Slovakia were then provinces of the empire of Austria-Hungary, many still had Austro-Hungarian citizenship and were considered to be resident enemy aliens. William Dostock, for example, who immigrated to Canada in 1910 from Austria-Hungary and was not yet naturalized was interned from 1915–1920 as an enemy alien.

German prisoners were mainly residents of Canada from Germany. Germans formed a large proportion of the detainees since Canada served as a place of detention for German prisoners of war on behalf of the British.

The prisoners were given various tasks; many worked in the forests as logging crews. In addition to the main camps, there were branch camps and labour camps.

See also
List of World War II prisoner-of-war camps in Canada

References

Canada
POW camps